The North Coast Line is the primary rail route in the Mid North Coast and Northern Rivers regions of New South Wales, Australia, and forms a major part of the Sydney–Brisbane rail corridor.

The line begins at Maitland and ends at Roma Street railway station in Brisbane, although freight services terminate at the yard at Acacia Ridge on the outskirts of Brisbane. Along the way, the railway passes through the towns of Dungog, Gloucester, Wingham, Taree, Kendall, Wauchope, Kempsey, Macksville, Nambucca Heads, Urunga, Sawtell, Coffs Harbour, Grafton, Casino and Kyogle. After the standard gauge line ends at Acacia Ridge, it forms a dual gauge line into Brisbane, running alongside parts of the Beenleigh railway line.

Since the Main Northern Line was closed north of Armidale in 1988, the North Coast line is now the only route between Sydney and Queensland. With the closure of former branches to Dorrigo (1972) and Murwillumbah (2004) there are no operating branches off the line.

The Bonalbo branch from Casino was stillborn, with partial construction left incomplete.

At the NSW/Queensland border is a long tunnel called Border Tunnel. Immediately south of it was Border Loop, a short crossing loop, which is now closed. About one kilometre south of that is the Cougal Spiral. These two locations are often confused.

The line is owned by the Transport Asset Holding Entity but leased to the Australian Rail Track Corporation until 2064.

History

The first North Coast railway was opened between Murwillumbah, Byron Bay and Lismore in 1894 and extended to Casino in 1903 and Grafton in 1905. A branch line was built to Kyogle in 1910, it was extended to South Brisbane in 1930.

The line was built between 1905 and 1932, and when completed, bypassed the Main North line and provided a quicker route up the eastern seaboard. The development of the line was hampered by the many large rivers that flow through the North Coast. The line also features the Cougal Spiral, which is one of only two spirals in New South Wales.

A railway was built from Maitland to Paterson and Dungog in 1911. It was extended to Gloucester and Taree in 1913 and to Wauchope, Kempsey, Coffs Harbour and from Glenreagh to South Grafton (now Grafton station) in 1915. The gap between Coffs Harbour and Glenreagh, which contains five tunnels, was completed in 1922.

The Clarence River was the most difficult river to cross and it was not crossed until 1932. In the meantime, services were connected by rail ferry that carried the carriages across the river. The opening of the Grafton Bridge in 1932 completed the Sydney – Brisbane line as the first standard gauge inter-capital link.

The completion of the Sydney–Brisbane link saw the Casino–Murwillumbah line become a branch line. In 1930 a branch line had been added to Ballina but this closed in 1949. The Murwillumbah branch closed in 2004.

A picturesque branch was opened from Glenreagh to Dorrigo in 1924, but was difficult to maintain due to the steep terrain and high rainfall and it was closed in 1972 after a washaway. The Glenreagh to Ulong section is proposed for reopening as a heritage tourist railway by the Glenreagh Mountain Railway. The Dorrigo Steam Railway & Museum is also being set up in Dorrigo as a museum and working exhibit.

Passenger services

Current services
NSW TrainLink operates three daily XPT services from Sydney terminating at Grafton, Casino and Brisbane.

Historical services
The premier trains on the North Coast line were the two daily services to Brisbane, the Brisbane Limited and the Brisbane Express. The Limited was the fastest service, stopping only at major stations, while the Express operated as a sweeper service stopping at most stations north of Grafton and provided connections to services on the Murwillumbah branch. Air-conditioned Sleeping cars had operated on the Brisbane Limited from 1960. In April 1973 the Brisbane Express was withdrawn and replaced by the Gold Coast Motorail, operating to Murwillumbah. The North Coast Daylight Express and North Coast Mail operated to Grafton until they were both replaced in 1985 by a single Holiday Coast XPT train. Following the Booz Allen Hamilton review of 1989 which recommended severe rationalisation of country rail services, the Brisbane and Murwillumbah services were converted to XPT operation in February 1990, and a locomotive hauled Grafton Express service to Grafton introduced in June 1990. In November 1993 the Grafton Express was also converted to XPT operation.

Freight services
When the Main North Line was closed north of Armidale in 1988, super-freighters to Brisbane began using the North Coast Line, operated by the State Rail Authority, then National Rail. Today, freight services on the North Coast Line are operated by Pacific National and SCT Logistics. These superfreighters do not serve any of the towns they pass through - in the government railways era, there would be regular freight services to towns such as Kempsey, Grafton and Casino.

The only freight train that regularly services the North Coast Line is a cement and sugar train for Grafton, Operated by Pacific National.

Improvement Works
The North Coast Line has significant curvature, equivalent to turning through 150 circles – 75.5 to the right and 74.5 to the left heading north, the difference of one circle due to the Cougal Spiral in the Border Ranges.

The Australian Rail Track Corporation has recently resleepered the track with concrete sleepers, upgraded the signals and installed new loops to increase efficiency. In mid-2011 they eased about 58 sections of curves on the line, increasing line speed for the XPT and freight trains. The curve easing was done without land purchases, so the track changes would be minor, staying within the existing corridor.

Location list
This is a list of all the locations and crossing loops on the North Coast line.

See also

 Rail transport in New South Wales

References

Bibliography

 

 
Mid North Coast
Railway lines opened in 1930
Standard gauge railways in Australia
Kyogle Council